Thame and its neighbouring Thameteng (upper Thame) are small Sherpa villages in Namche VDC of the Solukhumbu District in Nepal. These were the last year-round villages on the salt trading route that existed between Tibet, Nepal and India. It is the home to many famous Sherpa mountaineers, including Apa Sherpa.

Background
Apa Sherpa held the world record for summiting Mount Everest 21 times and Kami Rita Sherpa who has scaled the mountain 24 times as of May 2019. It was also a childhood home of Tenzing Norgay, who was (with Sir Edmund Hillary) one of the first men to climb Mount Everest. It is also where the famous Lama Zopa Rinpoche, the Lawudo Lama, head of the FPMT, was born. The Thame monastery is one of the oldest in the Khumbu region, and is famous for the annual Mani Rimdu festival.

In October 1995, a small hydro power plant was opened near Thame, with an installed capacity of 600 kW. It is operated by the Khumbu Bijuli Company.

References

Populated places in Solukhumbu District
Khumbu Pasanglhamu